The 2014–15 Hampton Pirates men's basketball team represented Hampton University during the 2014–15 NCAA Division I men's basketball season. The Pirates, led by sixth-year head coach Edward Joyner, played their home games at the Hampton Convocation Center and were members of the Mid-Eastern Athletic Conference. They finished the season 17–18, 8–8 in MEAC play to finish in sixth place. They defeated Morgan State, Maryland Eastern Shore, Norfolk State, and Delaware State to become champions of the MEAC tournament. They received an automatic bid to the NCAA tournament where they defeated Manhattan in the First Four before losing in the second round to Kentucky.

Roster

Schedule

|-
!colspan=9 style="background:#00216E; color:#FFFFFF;"| Regular season

|-
!colspan=9 style="background:#00216E; color:#FFFFFF;"| MEAC tournament

|-
!colspan=9 style="background:#00216E; color:#FFFFFF;"| NCAA tournament

References

Hampton Pirates men's basketball seasons
Hampton
Hampton Pirates men's basketball
Hampton
Hampton Pirates